Bila Vlaka is a village in Stankovci municipality in Zadar county, Croatia. According to the 2011 census it has 164 inhabitants.

References

Populated places in Zadar County